Wola Krogulecka  is a village in the administrative district of Gmina Stary Sącz, within Nowy Sącz County, Lesser Poland Voivodeship, in southern Poland.

The village has an approximate population of 420.

References

Wola Krogulecka